Unión Deportiva Santa Marta is a Spanish football team based in Santa Marta de Tormes, in the autonomous community of Castile and León. Founded in 1982 it plays in Tercera División RFEF – Group 8, holding home games at Estadio Alfonso San Casto, with a capacity of 1,500 seats.

History 
Since 1985, population growth in Santa Marta area has led to the development of the UD Santa Marta.

Season to season

12 seasons in Tercera División
1 season in Tercera División RFEF

Former players
 Cedric Mabwati (youth)

References

External links
Official website 
Futbolme team profile 
El Portal del Fútbol team profile 

Football clubs in Castile and León
Association football clubs established in 1982
1982 establishments in Spain
Province of Salamanca